Colletotrichum dematium f. spinaciae is a plant pathogen.

References

External links 
 Index Fungorum
 USDA ARS Fungal Database

dematium f. spinaciae
Fungal plant pathogens and diseases